Yugoslavia was present at the Eurovision Song Contest 1966, held in Luxembourg, Luxembourg.

Before Eurovision

Jugovizija 1966 
The Yugoslav national final to select their entry, was held on 23 January at the Dom Sindikata in Belgrade. The host was Mića Orlović. There were 13 songs in the final, from the five subnational public broadcasters; RTV Ljubljana, RTV Zagreb, RTV Belgrade, RTV Sarajevo, and RTV Skopje. The winner was chosen by the votes of an eight-member jury of experts, one juror for each of the six republics and the two autonomous provinces. The winning entry was "Brez besed" performed by Slovene singer Berta Ambrož, composed by Mojmir Sepe and written by Elza Budau. Vice Vukov represented Yugoslavia in Eurovision Song Contest 1963 and Eurovision Song Contest 1965.

At Eurovision
Berta Ambrož performed 5th on the night of the Contest following Luxembourg and preceding Norway. At the close of the voting the song had received 9 points, coming 7th in the field of 18 competing countries.

Voting

Notes

References

External links
Eurodalmatia official ESC club
Eurovision Song Contest National Finals' Homepage
Eurovision France
ECSSerbia.com
OGAE North Macedonia

1966
Countries in the Eurovision Song Contest 1966
Eurovision